The pterygoid branches of the maxillary artery, irregular in their number and origin, supply the lateral pterygoid muscle and  medial pterygoid muscle.

References

External links
 Overview at tufts.edu

Arteries of the head and neck